Alfons Dunin-Borkowski (born 19th-century in Planta, died 1938 in Raśniki) was a Polish painter, son of Mikołaj Dunin-Borkowski and Julianna Gromadzińska.

Between 1876 and 1879, the painter completed his art studies at the School of Arts in Warsaw under Wojciech Gerson and Aleksander Kamiński as well as under Władysław Łuszczkiewicz and Leopold Loeffler between 1879 and 1887 at the Jan Matejko Academy of Fine Arts in Kraków. Afterwards, Alfons took part in Jan Matejko's compositional classes. In 1888, he returned to his family settlement. In 1898, the artist moved to his wife's property in the Vilnius Region. After his wife's death, Alfons moved to Bikbarda in Perm Krai where he spent his time painting. From 1905, he lived in Suchedniów in modern-day Holy Cross Voivodeship.

References

External links

19th-century births
1918 deaths
People from Opatów County
People from Radom Governorate
Alfons
Realist painters
19th-century Polish painters
19th-century Polish male artists
20th-century Polish painters
20th-century Polish male artists
Polish male painters